Jim Ross is a former member of the Ohio House of Representatives.

References

Democratic Party members of the Ohio House of Representatives
Living people
Year of birth missing (living people)
Place of birth missing (living people)
20th-century American politicians